Gerald Lloyd "Jerry" Wisdom (28 October 1947 – 8 August 2009) was a Bahamian sprinter. He competed in the men's 4 × 100 metres relay at the 1968 Summer Olympics.

References

1947 births
2009 deaths
Athletes (track and field) at the 1968 Summer Olympics
Bahamian male sprinters
Bahamian male long jumpers
Olympic athletes of the Bahamas
Athletes (track and field) at the 1966 British Empire and Commonwealth Games
Athletes (track and field) at the 1970 British Commonwealth Games
Commonwealth Games competitors for the Bahamas
Jamaican emigrants to the Bahamas
Sportspeople from Kingston, Jamaica
UTEP Miners men's track and field athletes